Gunnar Källström (26 June 1908 – 23 January 1972) was a Finnish sailor. He competed in the Finn event at the 1952 Summer Olympics.

References

External links
 

1908 births
1972 deaths
Finnish male sailors (sport)
Olympic sailors of Finland
Sailors at the 1952 Summer Olympics – Finn
Sportspeople from Turku